A  is an ancient type of Japanese round bronze mirror decorated with images of gods and animals from Chinese mythology. The obverse side has a polished mirror and the reverse has relief representations of legendary Chinese shén ( "spirit; god"), xiān ( "transcendent; immortal"), and legendary creatures.

History 
The  style of bronze mirror originated from the Chinese magic mirrors and was frequently produced during the Han dynasty, Three Kingdoms, and Six Dynasties (1st–6th centuries CE). With the spread of Chinese bronze casting technology,  were also produced in Japan and the Lelang Commandery and Daifang Commandery in the Korean peninsula. The   ( "Records of Wei"), which is part of the Records of the Three Kingdoms, has the first historical reference to bronze mirrors in Japan. It chronicles tributary relations between Queen Himiko of Wa and the Wei court, and records that in 239, Emperor Cao Rui sent presents to Himiko, including "one hundred bronze mirrors".

Variations 
Archeological excavations of Japanese tombs from the Kofun period (3rd–7th centuries) have revealed numerous , and Japanese archeologists divide them into subtypes including: 

 
 
Kurotsuka kofun tomb excavated in Nara Prefecture contained 33  bronze mirrors. Some scholars believe they are the original mirrors that Emperor Cao Rui presented to Queen Himiko, but others disagree.

See also
Chinese magic mirror
TLV mirror
Yata no Kagami

References

Bibliography

External links
 7号鏡 神人龍虎画像鏡, Shinjūkyō picturing a transcendent, dragon, and tiger, Kobe Archeology Center (click image for navigation)
 三角縁神獣鏡, Sankakuen- shinjūkyō from the Yoshinogari site, Kyoto University Museum

Yayoi period
Kofun period
Archaeology of death
Archaeology of Japan
Mirrors